Gunsmoke (officially known as the Air Force Worldwide Gunnery Competition) was a biennial air-to-surface gunnery meet for conventional weapons, hosted by the United States Air Force. It was held beginning in 1949, excepting a few years.  It has been succeeded by Hawgsmoke. The competition occurred during odd-numbered years, alternating with the William Tell competition, which occurs during even-numbered years.

References

United States Air Force exercises
1949 establishments in the United States